Premiere Serie was a German television channel which broadcast television drama series.

History
It had its origins in "Herz & Co", a channel dedicated to soap operas launched in 1996 with the DF1 satellite package. When DF1 became Premiere World in 1999, the channel was rebranded and became "Sunset", a broader channel dedicated to television series.

The channel became "Premiere Serie" in its final form in 2002 when Premiere reorganized their channels. The new channel took content from both the old Sunset channel as well as Premiere Comedy and Premiere Scifi.

Many popular American drama series had their German television premiere on the channel, including Lost, Desperate Housewives, 24 and Medium.

On 4 October 2008, Premiere Serie was discontinued at 6:13 am in favor of the German version of Fox Channel. The last broadcast was Der Landarzt.

References

External links

Television channels and stations established in 1996
Television channels and stations disestablished in 2008
1996 establishments in Germany
2008 disestablishments in Germany
Defunct television channels in Germany